Richard Morthland (born November 10, 1959) is an American politician who is a member of the Rock Island County Board and was a Republican member of the Illinois General Assembly for a single term from 2011 to 2013. Morthland served on the Rock Island County Board from 2008 to 2011 and was reelected to the County Board in 2016. Morthland has a bachelor's degree from St. Ambrose University, master's degrees from Denver Seminary and Spring Arbor University, and is a doctoral student at Denver Seminary. In addition to politics, Morthland is a former assistant professor at Black Hawk College and is a farmer on his family's farm that dates back to 1842 when it was homesteaded in Coe Township.

On October 28, 2017, it was announced that Morthland would be the running mate of State Representative Jeanne Ives in the 2018 Republican primary against incumbent governor Bruce Rauner and incumbent lieutenant governor Evelyn Sanguinetti. The Ives-Morthland ticket lost receiving 48.60% of the vote to Rauner-Sanguinetti's 51.40% of the vote.

References

External links
Jeanne Ives for Governor/Rich Morthland for Lt. Governor
Rock Island County Board
Illinois General Assembly bio

1959 births
St. Ambrose University alumni
Living people
County board members in Illinois
Republican Party members of the Illinois House of Representatives
People from Rock Island County, Illinois
Farmers from Illinois
Denver Seminary alumni
Spring Arbor University alumni
21st-century American politicians
Candidates in the 2018 United States elections